Wiener Zeitung is an Austrian newspaper. It is one of the oldest, still published newspapers in the world. It is the official publication used by the Government of the Republic of Austria for legally-required announcements, such as company registrations, and was also the official publishing body for laws and executive orders until 2004.

As of 2002, Wiener Zeitung was among the four Austrian newspapers of record beside the right-liberal Die Presse, the left-liberal Der Standard and the Christian-liberal and conservative Salzburger Nachrichten.

History and profile
The newspaper, founded in 1703 under the name Wiennerisches Diarium, was considered the official mouthpiece of the Imperial Court due to its being supplied information directly and exclusively by the Court. The paper was published bi-weekly, usually running around eight pages in length. Supplements and other extensive reports were published during war time, mainly about Austria, the Franco-Austrian Alliance, and their mutual enemy Prussia. Field journals and diaries from the Austrian army were the main sources used by the paper, reporting on officer promotions, troop deployments and other public announcements pertaining to the war, mostly of local interest. Around 15 per cent of reports were about battles and armed conflicts while 3 per cent were about war crimes committed by Prussian troops.

Like many papers at the time, Wiennerisches Diarium started out by reporting regional and international news. In addition it published birth and wedding announcements as well as obituaries of the aristocracy and provided coverage of the imperial court.

Since 1780, the paper was known as Wiener Zeitung (meaning Viennese newspaper in English) and in 1810 it became the official government newspaper. In 1857 the government acquired the paper and it was printed until 1997 by the Austrian State Printing Office. The first edition after World War II appeared on 21 September 1945. The number of copies sold has grown from 4,500 in 1855 to an estimated 24,000 today. In 1998 the paper was transferred to a GmbH (Limited Liability Company), which is owned by the Austrian Government.

Wiener Zeitung is also the official publication used by the Government of the Republic of Austria for formal announcements. Such announcements, for example, civil service vacancies and changes in the commercial register, are printed in the Official Journal insert of Wiener Zeitung.  Until 2004 it also used to publish the official version of newly passed Austrian laws. Today the governmental version of newly passed statutes and treaties are officially published in the Internet, the law gazette thus is not available in a printed version anymore.

Until 2009 Wiener Zeitung'''s editor-in-chief was Andreas Unterberger, before being replaced by Reinhard Göweil. While Unterberger hired mostly outspoken conservative columnists, the paper returned to its liberal position under Reinhard Göweil.

The Austrian government is widely criticized among entrepreneurs because they are legally required to publish certain legal announcements, such as shareholder meeting conventions and changes of the commercial register in the Wiener Zeitung and therefore have to pay certain fees, although publications are also done through the Internet. Entrepreneurs and private newspapers argue, alleging anti-competitive measures, that the newspaper is financed through these mandatory fees. The Austrian Supreme Court dismissed claims on this matter. A decision of the European Court of Justice is pending. The issue is even more controversial since today the only authentic source of Austrian statutory law is the Internet, whereas business publications also have to be announced through Wiener Zeitung''.

See also
 List of newspapers in Austria

References

External links

 Wiener Zeitung homepage
 Exhibition to the 300-year anniversary of the Wiener Zeitung
 Austrian National Library | Annual overview of the issues of the Wiener Zeitung
 AEIOU | Wiener Zeitung

1703 establishments in Austria
German-language newspapers published in Austria
Newspapers published in Vienna
Daily newspapers published in Austria
Publications established in 1703
Austrian news websites
Conservatism in Austria